Ponto, New SouthWales is a civil parish of Gordon County, New South Wales, a Cadastral divisions of New South Wales.

The  parish is on the Macquarie River north of Wellington, New South Wales. The Molong–Dubbo railway line passes through the parish.

References

Parishes of Gordon County (New South Wales)